Clemmys is a genus of turtles currently containing a single extant species, the spotted turtle (Clemmys guttata).

Taxonomy
In the past, several other species were included in the genus, including a number of fossil species.  DNA analysis has restricted the genus to containing only the spotted turtle. Fossil species are now restricted to the Neogene of North America as far back as the Miocene.

Extant species formerly in Clemmys
Wood turtle - now Glyptemys insculpta
Bog turtle - now Glyptemys muhlenbergii
Western pond turtle - now Actinemys marmorata

Fossil species
†Clemmys hesperia Hay, 1903 - Pliocene 
†Clemmys owyheensis Brattstrom & Sturn, 1959 - Miocene (Hemphillian)

References

 
Turtle genera
Reptile genera with one living species
Taxa named by Ferdinand August Maria Franz von Ritgen